Al Bidda is a neighborhood of Doha, Qatar. It was previously the largest town in Qatar in the 19th century, before Doha, an offshoot of Al Bidda, grew in prominence. Al Bidda was incorporated as a district in the Doha municipality in the late 20th century.

Qatar's Amiri Diwan (Presidential Office) has been based in Al Bidda since 1915, after being converted from an abandoned Ottoman fort.

Etymology
Bidda is derived from the Arabic word badaa, meaning "to invent". When the previously uninhabited area first became populated, a settlement was essentially invented, giving it its name.

History

The earliest documented mention of Al Bidda was made in 1681, by the Carmelite Convent, in an account which chronicles several settlements in Qatar. In the record, the ruler and a fort in the confines of Al Bidda are alluded to.

19th century
Al Bidda became the most important town in the country after the decline of Zubarah in the early nineteenth century. Doha, the present-day capital, developed from Al Bidda. David Seaton, a British political resident in Muscat, detailed one of the earliest English accounts of Al Bidda in 1801:

In January 1823, political resident John MacLeod visited Al Bidda to meet with the ruler and initial founder of Doha, Buhur bin Jubrun, who was also the chief of the Al-Buainain tribe. MacLeod noted that Al Bidda was the only substantial trading port in the peninsula during this time. Following the founding of Doha, written records often conflated Al Bidda and Doha due to the extremely close proximity of the two settlements. Later that year, Lt. Guy and Lt. Brucks mapped and wrote a description of the two settlements. Despite being mapped as two separate entities, they were referred to under the collective name of Al Bidda in the written description.

In 1847, Al Bidda was demolished by the sheikh of Bahrain and its inhabitants were removed to Bahrain. The sheikh also placed economic blockade over the town in 1852. In 1867, a large number of ships and troops were sent from Bahrain to punish the people of Al Wakrah and Al Bidda. Abu Dhabi joined on Bahrain's behalf due to the conception that Al Wakrah served as a refuge for fugitives from Oman. Later that year, the combined forces sacked the two aforementioned Qatari cities with 2,000 men in what would come to be known as the Qatari–Bahraini War. A British record later stated "that the towns of Doha and Wakrah were, at the end of 1867 temporarily blotted out of existence, the houses being dismantled and the inhabitants deported".

Around early 1871, the town became a base of operations for Bedouins resisting Ottoman rule after they established a foothold in Eastern Arabia that year. By December 1871, emir Jassim bin Mohammed authorized the Ottomans to send 100 troops and equipment to Al Bidda. Shortly after, Qatar was assimilated as a province in the Ottoman Empire, and Al Bidda was recognized as the official provincial capital.

Al Bidda Fort served as the final stronghold for Ottoman troops in the 1893 Battle of Al Wajbah. They surrendered after Jassim bin Mohammed's troops cut off the town's water supply and besieged the fortress. An Ottoman report compiled the same year reported that Al Bidda and Doha had a combined population of 6,000 inhabitants, jointly referring to both towns by the name of 'Katar'. Al Bidda was classified as the western section of Katar, and was stated to have mainly accommodated members of the Al Kuwari and Soudan tribes.

20th century
In J.G. Lorimer's Gazetteer of the Persian Gulf first published in 1908, he describes Al Bidda as a large town which is a natural harbor due to its reefs, but states that vessels of more than 15 feet draft cannot pass. The land is described as stony desert which is 40 or 50 feet above sea-level. The majority of its inhabitants, who were said to be involved in pearl fishing, were composed of Qatari tribes, such as the Al-Soudan, Bahraini shopkeepers and immigrants from Al-Hasa.

Geography
Al Bidda borders the following districts:
Mushayrib to the south, separated by Al Rayyan Road.
Al Jasrah to the east, separated by Mohammed Bin Jassim Street.
Rumeilah (Zone 12) to the northwest, separated by Rumeilah Street, and Rumeilah (Zone 21) to the west by Onaiza Street.

Landmarks

Al Sheukh Mosque on Al Qasr Street.
Al Bidda Historical Tower on Umm Al Dome Street.
Al Bidda Fort on Jebel Soudan.
Al Bidda West Park on Al Rayyan Road.
Qatar Bowling Centre (under the auspices of Qatar Olympic Committee) on Al Qurtubi Street.
Amiri Diwan on Al Corniche Street.
Al Bidda Clock Tower on Al Corniche Street.
Al Bidda Park (formerly known as Rumaila Park) is partially located in Rumeilah on Al Corniche Street and is split into two parts by Rumeilah Street.

Development
Al Bidda Tower, a 215-metre (705') tall building, is currently being constructed in the district. It is planned to accommodate 43 stories and will have an aggregate net rentable area of 41,500 m² (10¼ acres). The curtain wall features a whirlwind design. Facilities will include commercial space, business centers, art galleries, restaurants, and a health club.

Transport
Major roads that run through the district are Qalat Al Askar Street, Jassim Bin Mohammed Street, Corniche Street and Al Rayyan Road.

The underground Al Bidda station currently serves as an interchange station between the Red Line and the Green Line of the Doha Metro. As part of the metro's Phase 1, the station was inaugurated on 10 December, 2019, along with all other Green Line stations. It is located in Al Bidda Park on Al Rayyan Road. The station is one of the Doha Metro's most vital stations as it provides connectivity between two of the Doha Metro's three existing lines.

Among the station's facilities are an Ooredoo self-service machine, a prayer room and restrooms. Nearby landmarks within walking distance include Al Bidda Park and the Qatar Bowling Centre. There are no metrolinks for the station.

Demographics

As of the 2010 census, the settlement comprised 91 housing units and 6 establishments. There were 1,102 people living in the settlement, of which 98% were male and 2% were female. Out of the 1,102 inhabitants, 99% were 20 years of age or older and 1% were under the age of 20.

Employed persons made up 99% of the population. Females accounted for 1% of the working population, while males accounted for 99% of the working population.

Gallery

References

Communities in Doha
Doha